Echelatus is a genus of spread-wing skippers in the family Hesperiidae. It is monotypic, being represented by the single species Echelatus sempiternus, the common bluevent, which is found in North America.

Subspecies
The following subspecies are recognised:
 Echelatus sempiternus dilloni Bell & Comstock, 1948
 Echelatus sempiternus sempiternus (Butler & H. Druce, 1872)
 Echelatus sempiternus simplicior Möschler, 1876

References

Natural History Museum Lepidoptera genus database

Further reading

 

Hesperiidae genera
Hesperiidae
Pyrginae
Butterflies described in 1872